Khalid Springer (born 3 July 1982) is a Barbadian cricketer. He played in two List A and three Twenty20 matches for the Barbados cricket team in 2008 and 2009.

See also
 List of Barbadian representative cricketers

References

External links
 

1982 births
Living people
Barbadian cricketers
Barbados cricketers